Bride is a 2018 Burmese horror film, directed by Wyne starring A Linn Yaung, Phway Phway and May. The film, produced by Dawei Film Production premiered in Myanmar on December 28, 2018.

Cast
A Linn Yaung as Zarni Htike
Phway Phway as Thaw Tar
May as Su Myat, the ghost
Zin Myo as Htin Aung

References

External links

2018 films
2010s Burmese-language films
Burmese horror films
Films shot in Myanmar
2018 horror films
Films directed by Wyne